Djibouti is a one party dominant state with the People's Rally for Progress currently in power. There are currently no opposition members in the National Assembly, partially because of the rule that the party or coalition with a majority vote in each district wins all of that district's seats . This voting system is seen to facilitate the dominance of the pro-presidential coalition. The main opposition coalitions are the Union for Democratic Change (UAD) and Union for Democratic Movements (UMD).

The parties

Coalitions

Pro-government

Anti-government

Defunct

See also

Djibouti
 
Djibouti
Political parties
Parties